Welker is a name originating from Germany, most commonly used as a surname. Welker has been used as a unisex given name, however this is less common than its use as a surname. Notable people with the name include:

Surname:
David Welker (born 1964), American artist
Frank Welker (born 1946), American actor and voice actor
Hans Welker (1907–1968), German football player
Heinrich Welker (1912–1981), German physicist
Herman Welker (1906–1957), American politician
Jim Welker (born 1950), American politician
Kristen Welker (born 1976), American television journalist
Martin Welker (1819–1902), American politician
Michael Welker (born 1947), German theologian
Wes Welker, (born 1981), NFL player

Given name:
Welker Cochran (1897-1960), American billiards player
Welker Marçal de Almeida (born 1986), Brazilian footballer

See also
Welcker
Walker (surname)

German-language surnames